Craterobathra is a moth genus of in the family Heliodinidae.

Species
Craterobathra argyracma Diakonoff, 1968
Craterobathra demarcata Diakonoff, 1968
Craterobathra ornata Diakonoff, 1968
Craterobathra tabellifera Meyrick, 1927

References

Heliodinidae